Indian Summer, also known as Alive & Kicking, is a 1996 British drama film directed by Nancy Meckler and starring Jason Flemyng, Antony Sher and Bill Nighy. The script was written by Martin Sherman, author of the play Bent. The film was released in the UK as Indian Summer and in the United States as  Alive & Kicking due to the recently released Indian Summer by Mike Binder in 1993.

Plot
The story follows a self-involved and very focused dancer, Torino, who has just lost his lover, Ramon, to AIDS. He then refuses to let the fact that he is HIV positive disrupt his career as he rehearses a staging of Indian Summer, a gay-themed ballet about love and lust.

After Ramon's funeral, the dancer begins a troubled relationship with an older man, Jack, a therapist, who also has problems with controlling his own drinking.

Cast
 Jason Flemyng as  Tonio
 Antony Sher as Jack
 Bill Nighy as Tristan
 Diane Parish as Millie
 Dorothy Tutin as  Luna
 Anthony Higgins as  Ramon
 Philip Voss as Duncan
 Aiden Waters as Vincent
 Natalie Roles as Catherine
 Freddy Douglas as Luke
 Kenneth Tharp as Howard
 Michael Keegan-Dolan as Alan
 Ruth Lass as Night Nurse
 Linda Bassett as Doctor
 Hilary Reynolds as Nurse

Reception
The film's reviews were mixed. It holds a 83% "rotten" rating on Rotten Tomatoes based on 6 reviews.

Timeout's review states "gritty British realism, resolutely unglamorous and looking always rather TV-bound," but the script, "is cogent and witty".

A DVD of the film was released in the UK on 6 September 2010.

References

External links

1996 films
1996 drama films
British LGBT-related films
British drama films
Gay-related films
HIV/AIDS in British films
1996 LGBT-related films
Film4 Productions films
1990s English-language films
1990s British films